Southall Studios was a film studio located in Southall, Middlesex (now west London) which operated between 1924 and 1958.

The studio was constructed on the site of a former aircraft hangar by the silent film director and producer G.B. Samuelson. The original buildings were destroyed in a fire in 1936, but the studio was rebuilt. Following the First World War, the studio was used for feature film production under the overall control of John Grierson. Later, it was used for television programmes such as Colonel March of Scotland Yard broadcast in 1955 and 1956.

Tempean Films produced several films such as Kill Me Tomorrow at Southall during the 1950s, with the feature film The Crawling Eye, based on The Trollenberg Terror TV series, being the last film released credited with the Southall name.

External links
 Southall Film Studios
 Southall Studios at britmovie.co.uk

References 

British film studios
1936 fires in the United Kingdom
Media and communications in the London Borough of Ealing
Buildings and structures in the London Borough of Ealing
Southall